Tim Ludeman (born 23 June 1987) is an Australian cricketer. Ludeman is a wicket-keeper who formerly played for South Australia.
He is a right-handed batsman and wicket-keeper.

On 18 December 2014, Ludeman made 92 not out from just 44 deliveries in a Big Bash League match for the Adelaide Strikers against the Melbourne Stars. His fifty came off 18 balls, making it the fastest in BBL history at the time.

References

External links

Living people
1987 births
Australian cricketers
Adelaide Strikers cricketers
Melbourne Renegades cricketers
People from Warrnambool
Cricketers from Victoria (Australia)
South Australia cricketers
Wicket-keepers